Dolly Parton's Christmas of Many Colors: Circle of Love is a 2016 American made-for-television drama film based on a true story by Dolly Parton, written by Pamela K. Long and directed by Stephen Herek. The film is a sequel to Coat of Many Colors and premiered on NBC on November 30, 2016.

Plot
Family patriarch Lee Parton makes sacrifices to have enough money to buy his wife the wedding ring he could never afford. The children also sacrifice their own Christmas presents to give their mother this special gift. Dolly's Uncle Billy helps her begin to see that her voice and talent might extend beyond rural Tennessee. Various crisis situations, some life-threatening, make the family's Christmas a challenge.

Cast
 Alyvia Alyn Lind as Dolly Parton
 Jennifer Nettles as Avie Lee Parton, the devout matriarch of the Partons
 Ricky Schroder as Robert Lee Parton, the hard-working patriarch of the Partons
 Gerald McRaney as Rev. Jake Owens, Avie Lee's father and a preacher 
 Kelli Berglund as Willadeene Parton, the eldest sister of Dolly, who also strives to protect her family and siblings but her insecurities make her struggle sometimes and often feels alone.
 Stella Parton as Corla Bass, owner of the town market and a gossip
 Dolly Parton as the Painted Lady, a prostitute who befriends Dolly
Hannah Nordberg as Judy Ogle, Dolly's schoolmate
Mary Lane Haskell as Miss Moody, the school teacher of Dolly
Forrest Deal as Rudy Sanders, former school bully
Christopher Ryan Lewis as Claude Sanders, Rudy and Gloria's brother
Hannah Goergen as Cassie Parton
Farrah Mackenzie as Stella Parton, Dolly's younger sister
Parker Sack as David Parton, Dolly's oldest brother
Dylan Rowen as Denver Parton, Dolly's second-oldest brother
Blane Crockarell as Bobby Parton, Dolly's younger brother
Jane McNeill as Aunt Estelle
Cameron Jones as Uncle Billy, a musician trying to help Dolly become a star and the brother of Dolly’s mother.

Production

Filming

Christmas of Many Colors was filmed in Covington, and Conyers, Georgia, and Sevier County, Tennessee, the latter at Dollywood for introductory and closing scenes from Dolly Parton. Filming took place during summer 2016.

Reception

Ratings
In its initial November 30, 2016 broadcast, Christmas of Many Colors was seen by 11.53 million viewers and received a 1.7/6 rating/share in the 18-49 age demographic.

Accolades
Christmas of Many Colors was nominated for Outstanding Television Movie at the 69th Primetime Emmy Awards, which aired September 17, 2017.

References

External links

2016 television films
2016 films
NBC network original films
American Christmas films
Christmas television specials
Christmas
Films set in the 1950s
Films directed by Stephen Herek
Films shot in Georgia (U.S. state)
Films set in Tennessee
Films shot in Tennessee